The Gilgit–Shandur Road is 212 km provincial highway of Gilgit-Baltistan linking Gilgit with Shandur. From Shandur, the road continues and crosses into Khyber Pakhtunkhwa province, where it becomes the Chitral–Shandur Road or KP Highway 2. In 2013, the Gilgit-Baltistan Legislative Assembly unanimously passed a resolution demanding that both the roads be "renamed" to a single Gilgit–Chitral Road and be upgraded.

Update 2020:
It's now a part of the National Highway network, identified as N-140

See also
Provincial Highways of Gilgit-Baltistan

References

Highways in Gilgit-Baltistan
Roads in Gilgit-Baltistan
Gilgit District
Ghizer District